Henry de Sully (died 1189) was Abbot of Fécamp and Bishop-designate of Salisbury and Archbishop-elect of York.

Life
Henry was son of William, Count of Sully, the eldest brother of Stephen,  King of England and Henry of Blois, Bishop of Winchester. Henry's mother was William's wife, Agnes of Sully, who had been attached to the household of Adela of Blois, William's mother. Although William was the eldest son of Adela and her husband Stephen, Count of Blois, he was passed over for the comital title and his younger brother Theobald became Count of Champagne on their father's death.

As compensation, Henry of Blois then named Henry de Sully the abbot of Fécamp Abbey in Normandy. Later in 1140, after his grandmother's death, Henry was nominated to become Archbishop of York, but his election was again quashed this time by Pope Innocent II because Henry wished to hold both the abbacy of  Fécamp along with the archbishopric. Henry died at Fécamp in 1189.

Citations

References

 Barlow, Frank The English Church 1066–1154 London:Longman 1979 
 Davis, R. H. C. King Stephen 1135–1154 Third Edition London:Longman 1990 
 Greenway, Diana E., ed., "Bishops", in Fasti Ecclesiae Anglicanae 1066-1300: Volume 4, Salisbury, (London, 1991), pp. 1–7.
 Greenway, Diana E., ed.,  "List 1: Archbishops", in Fasti Ecclesiae Anglicanae 1066-1300: Volume 6, York, (London, 1999), pp. 1–7.
 Huscroft, Richard Ruling England 1042–1217 London: Pearson Longman 2005 
 LoPrete, Kimberly Adela Countess and Lord Dublin:Fourcourts Press, 2007 

 

House of Sully
Bishops of Salisbury
Archbishops of York
1189 deaths
Fécamp Abbey
Year of birth unknown
Henry
12th-century English Roman Catholic bishops